The Santa Cueva de Nuestra Señora de Covadonga (English: the Holy Cave of Our Lady of Covadonga) is a Catholic sanctuary located in Asturias, northern Spain. It is a cave in the Picos de Europa mountains, which gives its name to the parish of Covadonga in the municipality of Cangas de Onís. The name refers to the sanctuary, dedicated to the Virgin of Covadonga, where the first battle of the Spanish Reconquest took place in 718.

Description and history 

The origin of the cave as place of cult is controversial. It seems to have been originally another place of confluence of Pagan Cult (in this case a fountain and cave together, seen as holy sites) as the Old English Wilweorthunga, meaning "well of worship" had been in Prehistorical times and still during the Roman Empire occupation. The Christian tradition has it that Pelagius, chasing a criminal, who had taken refuge in the cave, meets a hermit who was venerating the Virgin Mary. The hermit asked Pelagius to forgive the criminal, since the criminal had resorted to the protection of the Virgin, and says that one day that he too would need to seek shelter in the Cave.

Muslim chronicles about the Battle of Covadonga say that in this cave  Pelagius's forces fled, feeding on honey bees left in the crevices of the rock. Christian chronicles claim that the miraculous intervention of the Virgin Mary was crucial in the victory, repelling attacks against the cave.

The first construction in the Holy Cave dates back of the reign of Alfonso I of Asturias, who, to commemorate the victory of Pelagius to the Muslims, built a chapel dedicated to the Virgin Mary, that would give rise to the invocation of the Our Lady of Covadonga (popularly known as La Santina). In addition to the altar dedicated to the Virgin, two others were built for Saint John the Baptist and Saint Andrew. Alfonso presented this church to the Benedictine monks.

The cave was covered with wood, and in 1777 a fire destroyed the medieval Marian statue. The current wooden image of Virgin and Child dates to the 16th century and was donated to the sanctuary by the Cathedral of Oviedo in 1778. 

During the civil war the Virgin image disappeared and was found in the Embassy of Spain in France in 1939. The present chapel of Romanesque style is the work of Luis Menéndez-Pidal and Alvarez.

Royal pantheon of Covadonga 
The shrine of Covadonga was very important for the early (8th century) Christian kingdom of Asturias.

 Pelagius of Asturias (died 737). First king of Asturias and son of Duke Favila.
 Queen Gaudiosa, Pelagius's wife.
 A sister of the King Pelagius.
 Alfonso I of Asturias (693-757). Third king of Asturias, son of Peter of Cantabria, Duke of Cantabria.
 Queen Ermesinda. Alfonso I's wife, daughter of King Pelagius and Queen Gaudiosa, and sister of the King Favila of Asturias.

Pelagius died in Cangas de Onís, where he had his court in 737. After his death, his body was buried in the Church of Santa Eulalia of Abamia, located in the Asturian town of Abamia, where his wife had been also  previously buried. The chronicler Ambrosio Morales noted in his work that Alfonso X the Wise, king of Castile and Leon, ordered to move the remains of Pelagius and his wife to the Holy Cave of Covadonga.

See also 
Cueva de Achbinico
Marian apparition
Royal Collegiate church of San Fernando

References

External links 
 
 Real Sitio de Covadonga

Buildings and structures in Asturias
Shrines to the Virgin Mary
Covadonga
Tourist attractions in Asturias
Religion in Asturias
Landforms of Asturias
Burials in Spain
Pelagius of Asturias
Roman Catholic shrines in Spain